The Peel District School Board (PDSB; known as English-Language Public District School Board No. 19 prior to 1999) is a school district that serves approximately 153,000 kindergarten to grade 12 students at more than 259 schools in the Region of Peel (municipalities of Caledon, Brampton and Mississauga) in Ontario, immediately to the west of Toronto.

The board employs more than 15,000 full-time staff and is the largest employer in Peel Region. As of 2012 it is the second largest school board in Canada.

History 

In 1970, 10 local boards came together as the Peel County Board of Education. In 1969, the board served a community of a quarter million residents—20 percent of the population. The newly formed Peel County Board had 50,000 students in 114 schools and an operating budget of $41 million. (2009 annual report)

In 1973, the name changed to the Peel Board of Education. The current name, Peel District School Board, was approved in 1998.

On September 1, 2006, the school board announced that on Wednesday September 6, 2006, would launch a new website in 25 languages, all spoken in the Peel Region, to help parents who have a first language other than English.

Directors
 John Fraser, –1988, namesake of John Fraser Secondary School
 Bob Lee, 1988–c. 1993, namesake of Robert J. Lee Public School
 Harold Brathwaite, 1994–2020, namesake of Harold M. Brathwaite Secondary School
 Jim Grieve, 2002–2009, namesake of James Grieve Public School
 Tony Pontes, 2010–2017, namesake of Tony Pontes Public School
 Peter Joshua, 2017–2020
 Colleen Russell-Rawlins, 2020-2021 (interim)
 Rashmi Swarup, 2021-present

Peel board logo 
The Peel board unveiled its current logo in September 2006. In November 2004, the board approved the creation of the Picture the Future committee—a cross section of staff and trustees—to oversee the creation of the first new logo since 1969. The committee worked with design firm Hambly and Woolly Inc, selected through a competitive RFP process, to develop a new visual identity for approval by the board. The design was based on the feedback from over 500 people including staff, students, parents, representatives of faith and culture communities and unions and federations.

Equity

We Welcome the World Centres
In 2009, the Peel board opened three We Welcome the World Centres in Brampton and Mississauga. As an initiative to bring awareness to the We Welcome the World Centres, Ruth Thompson Middle School created a video that montage of various students, teachers and staff saying the word " Peace" in 2008 and "Welcome" in 2009 in their native tongue. The centres help newcomer families with school-aged children register for school and get settled in Canada. Welcome Centre staff provide assistance and information about free services in many languages.

Religious Accommodation 
Through a program called Faith Forward, the Peel board provides resources to help broaden awareness of a wide range of faiths, cultures and religious celebrations. These resources include a Holy Days and Holidays calendar, poster series, resource guide, lesson plans and training. The board’s direction is any celebrations of faith and culture need to be inclusive of all students and staff.

The board acknowledges each individual’s right to follow, or not to follow, religious beliefs and practices free from discriminatory or harassing behaviour and will take all reasonable steps to provide religious accommodations to staff and students. Examples of accommodations are observation of major holy days, dietary requirements, religious attire, and space for private prayer or rituals.

Co-Accountable Model 
The Peel board believes the work of making all staff feel welcomed and included goes beyond hiring. Its Co-accountable Model project supports diversity across all employee groups. At the core of the project is the belief that any work at real inclusion must actively involve the people inside and outside the organization in a new kind of partnership—one in which accountability for success is shared.
 
Under the Co-accountable Model, the Peel board will:
 create formal mentoring events and summits, including the creation of targeted advisory groups for all protected classes to assist in community outreach
 train key leaders on fundamental concepts related to beliefs, assumptions and behaviours
 make online simulations accessible to all Peel board employees to foster awareness of the diversity dividend
 provide advice and counsel on this project as it moves forward

Demographics and cultural sensitivity
Among Canadian school districts, the Peel board is among the most ethnically and culturally diverse. The Peel District School Board enacted procedures and policies intended to accept and embrace various cultures and ethnic groups, and Brian Woodland, the school board's director of communications, said that the district embraces various religions. The school board alters curricula to accommodate students of different backgrounds; for instance, if students from a religious background or culture are forbidden from drawing people, the school will alter the art curriculum. Peel was among the first Canadian school boards to permit students to wear kirpans to classes. The school board does not allow religious leaders to lead prayer sessions within schools.

Programs

Adult and continuing education 
The Peel board offers a variety of adult programs during the day, at night and on weekends. Programs include credit programs to help adults complete their secondary school diploma, adult ESL programs to help adults develop and refine their English language skills, and literacy and basic skills courses to help adults upgrade specific skills.

The board received media attention in 2011 for its Foreign-Trained Teacher course, a course designed to help new Canadians enter the teacher profession.

The Peel board also offers International Language Programs on weekends for school-aged students. At the secondary level, students can earn credits towards their secondary school diploma. Students also have access to night and summer school, literacy and math support, and online school.

Alternative programs
The Peel board’s Peel Alternative School (PAS) offers a variety of alternative programs designed with the individual needs of students in mind. Programs include:

Foundations Program
The Foundations program is for students in at least their third year of high school who have not successfully completed grades 9 and 10. Students benefit from small class sizes and individual attention while they take up to three credits per semester.

Fresh Start Suspension and Expulsion Programs
Students under suspension or expulsion from a Peel board school who are motivated to change their behaviour can attend Fresh Start. Through the programs, students continue academic studies while learning the skills required to be successful in school, in relationships and in the community.

Junior High, Intermediate, and Senior Alternative Programs
These programs are designed for students who are at risk of dropping out of school. Through smaller classes and more individual attention, students develop improved social skills and attitudes towards school and society.

Supervised Alternative Learning (SAL)
SAL is a program for students aged 14 to 17 who, for a variety of reasons, are at risk of leaving school early. A SAL Plan is created to help students progress towards obtaining their Ontario Secondary School Diploma or achieving other educational and personal goals.

Temporary External Learning Link (TELL)
The TELL Program is designed for students in at least their third year of high school. These students typically have not acquired the credit accumulation of their peers and require a flexible schedule due to family or work commitments.

Teen Education and Motherhood Program (TEAM)
The TEAM Program is for students between 14 and 20, in grades 9 to 12, who are pregnant or who have a child. The academic program is individualized to meet each student’s needs. There is a focus on parenting skills, and students participate in weekly workshops presented by a Peel Public Health nurse.

Regional programs 
Regional programs start in grades 6, 7 and 9. Students in regional programs still complete all of the requirements of the Ontario curriculum, but there is an increased focus on an area of interest. Information nights take place throughout the fall for students registering to start the program the following September. Programs include:
 Arts
 Flexography (package print technology)
 International Baccalaureate
 Advanced Placement
 International Business and Technology
 SciTech
 Sports 
 Strings
 Truck and Coach

French immersion
French immersion begins in grade 1 and extended French begins in grade 7. Registration for both programs takes place in January. The Peel board provides on-line information for parents on how to decide whether French immersion is right for their child and other information about French learning.

Specialist high skills major programs
Specialist High Skills Major programs start in grade 11 and are offered in the following areas:
 Arts
 Business and entrepreneurial studies
 Construction
 Environment
 Health and wellness
 Hospitality and tourism
 Information and communications technology
 Justice, community safety and emergency services
 Manufacturing
 Sports
 Transportation

Regional Enhanced Program
The Peel District School Board runs the ELC Regional Enhanced Program, in grades 1 to 12, a gifted education program, for students defined as having "an unusually advanced degree of general intellectual ability that requires differentiated learning experiences of a depth and breadth beyond those normally provided in the regular school programme to satisfy the level of educational potential indicated."

The curriculum of an Enhanced program could include special tasks or projects designed to challenge gifted students. At the high school level, the course material is the same but the manner of teaching and/or the assignments given can vary based on the needs of the students.

There are two high schools designated as Peel Regional Enhanced Centres that provide the Enhanced programming and curriculum from Grade 9 to Grade 12.  The precise number and variety of Enhanced courses differs from school to school, but most schools offer the core mandatory courses as Enhanced. Bussing and transportation for Enhanced students is provided by the school board.

Secondary school rankings
The Peel District School Board does not officially support the Fraser ranking system and does not rank its schools. The most up-to-date Fraser rankings can be found on the Fraser website.

Organization of the school system within the Board

The Board organizes its schools into "school families", which essentially designate the respective feeder schools into each of the secondary schools within the PDSB. The following list is the organization from the 2018-2019 school year.

Caledon

Brampton

Mississauga

Controversies
Former Vice Principal Ranjit Khatkur of South Asian background alleged that her ethnic/racial background was the reason she was overlooked for promotion to principal despite fulfilling all requirements. Khatkur launched a legal complaint at the Human Rights Tribunal of Ontario alleging systematic discrimination in the Peel public board. It eventually culminated in allowing the Turner Consulting Group to release a Research Report on Hiring and Promotion at the Peel District School Board. The 111-page report led to changes in the hiring and promotion policies in the Peel Board. Previously Principals conducted interviews alone without having to demonstrate why they chose the applicants they did or document what questions they asked. The changes include having two people conducting an interview to eliminate bias, the principal is not part of the promotion process thereby eliminating their "gatekeeper" role, and begin a diversity census. The report found that it was not only ethnic or visible minorities that experienced discrimination. Tana Turner found that even some white males suspected nepotism favouritism or cronyism.

Trustees

Current trustees for the Peel board are
 Chair - Brad MacDonald
 Vice Chair - David Green

See also

Dufferin Peel Catholic District School Board
List of school districts in Ontario
List of high schools in Ontario

References

External links
Peel District School Board
MNS Multicultural, Settlement and Education Partnership
Peel District School Board Special Education Page
PDSB Guidelines in Assessing Students for Enhanced Learning Programs (.doc)
Association for Bright Children - Peel Chapter

 
Education in the Regional Municipality of Peel
Education in Mississauga